Tun Jeanne Abdullah née Danker (born 29 July 1953) is married to the former Prime Minister of Malaysia, Tun Abdullah Ahmad Badawi. She married Abdullah Badawi while he was in office. She is his second wife after the death of Badawi's first wife, Endon Mahmood.

Jeanne was formerly married to the younger brother of Abdullah's first late wife. She was also a manager at the Seri Perdana residential complex and has two children from her previous marriage. However, earlier in March that year, the premier dismissed rumours about his plans to remarry even though the rumours had been circulating for more than a year.

Early life 
Born Jeanne Danker on 29 July 1953 in Kuala Lumpur to a Roman Catholic Portuguese-Eurasian (Kristang) family with roots in the state of Malacca,  she was the eldest of four siblings. She is an alumna of SMK Assunta in Petaling Jaya, Selangor.

Jeanne later converted to Islam at the age of 23, when she married her first husband, Othman Mahmood, who was the younger brother of Abdullah's first late wife, Tun Endon Mahmood.

Jeanne worked in the hotel management field at major hotels including Kuala Lumpur Hilton and the Pan Pacific Hotel. At one point, she was supervisor of the Malaysian Deputy Prime Minister's official residence while Abdullah Badawi was Deputy Prime Minister, and became the manager of Seri Perdana, the Prime Minister's residence, when Abdullah assumed the premiership.

Family 
Jeanne has two daughters, Nadiah Kimie,  and Nadene Kimie,  from her previous marriage. Nadiah runs a visual communications company in Kuala Lumpur. Nadene is involved in the fashion industry, dealing with fashion-related and lifestyle projects.

Marriage with Abdullah 

On 9 June 2007, she was escorted in a Proton Chancellor car bearing the Prime Minister’s favourite license number 13, by police from her home in Damansara Perdana to be married to Abdullah Badawi at a private ceremony attended by close family members at the Prime Minister's official residence, Seri Perdana in Putrajaya. The bride-to-be arrived at around 2.20 pm. Among the wedding guests which included some 50 relatives were Abdullah’s daughter, Nori, daughter-in-law Azrene Abdullah, his four grandchildren, Jeanne’s two daughters, her father Mathew Danker and Endon’s nine surviving brothers and sisters. Also present at the private wedding were Yayasan Budi Penyayang executive officer Leela Mohd Ali, Abdullah’s private secretary Datuk Mohamed Thajudeen Abdul Wahab, his brother-in-law Telekom Malaysia Berhad chairman, Tan Sri Ir. Muhammad Radzi Mansor and wife Puan Sri Aizah Mahmood.

The marriage was solemnised in the surau of Seri Perdana by the Imam from the Putra Mosque of Putrajaya, Haji Abd Manaf Mat, at 2.50 pm and was witnessed by the prime minister's son, Kamaluddin, and son-in-law, Khairy Jamaluddin. Abdullah slipped a solitaire diamond ring onto Jeanne's left ring finger and kissed her on the cheek. Jeanne then slipped a wedding band on Abdullah’s finger before taking his hands together into hers and kissing them.

Later in the evening, Abdullah and Jeanne visited Endon's grave which is located at the Taman Selatan Muslim cemetery in Precinct 20 of Putrajaya.

Her first official engagement as the wife of the Prime Minister was when she accompanied Abdullah to Brunei on 11 June 2007 to attend a banquet hosted by Sultan Hassanal Bolkiah of Brunei in conjunction with the wedding of the Sultan's fourth daughter Princess Hajah Majeedah Nuurul Bulqiah to Pengiran Khairul Khalil Pengiran Syed Haji Jaafar.

At a press conference after the engagement was announced, Abdullah stated he had known her for about two decades, as she had been his first wife's sister-in-law; Jeanne had been married to Othman Mahmood, who was the younger brother of Abdullah's first wife, Tun Endon Mahmood. Abdullah also denied that Endon had asked him to marry Jeanne, but said Endon had loved her as "Otherwise she would not have asked her to manage our official residence". Abdullah also said that there would be no bersanding ceremony or hantaran (exchange of wedding gifts) as this was not his first marriage.

Public life
During late 2007, Toh Puan (then Datin Seri) Jeanne Abdullah was made Open University Malaysia's second chancellor. The first was the late Tun Endon Mahmood, the former Prime Minister's first wife before passing away. In addition to that she is Chairperson of Landskap Malaysia and patron of Paralympic Council of Malaysia.

Honours
Upon marriage to Abdullah, Jeanne was automatically conferred the female version of her husband's honorific title, Dato' Seri, which is Datin Seri. Later on 3 April 2009, the King of Malaysia, Yang di-Pertuan Agong Tuanku Mizan Zainal Abidin at Istana Negara awarded the Seri Setia Mahkota (SSM) upon Jeanne. The SSM carried the honorific title Tun for the recipients. The award was conferred by the Yang di-Pertuan Agong in conjunction to the handing over of Prime Minister office from her husband to Najib Razak.

Honours of Malaysia
  : 
  Grand Commander of the Order of Loyalty to the Crown of Malaysia (SSM) – Tun (2009)
  :
  Knight Grand Commander of the Order of the Crown of Selangor (SPMS) – Datin Paduka Seri (2007)
  :
  Knight Grand Commander of the Premier and Exalted Order of Malacca (DUNM) – Datuk Seri Utama (2007)
  :
  Knight Commander of the Order of the Star of Hornbill Sarawak (DA) – Datuk Amar (2008)

See also 
 Spouse of the Prime Minister of Malaysia

Notes and references

1953 births
Living people
People from Kuala Lumpur
Spouses of prime ministers of Malaysia
Converts to Sunni Islam from Catholicism
Malaysian Muslims
Malaysian people of Kristang descent
Malaysian people of Portuguese descent
Grand Commanders of the Order of Loyalty to the Crown of Malaysia
Knights Commander of the Order of the Star of Hornbill Sarawak
Knights Grand Commander of the Order of the Crown of Selangor